Lev Vasilyevich Saychuk (12 April 1923 – 24 January 2005) was a Soviet fencer. He competed in the individual and team épée events at the 1952 Summer Olympics and the team event at the 1956 Summer Olympics.

References

External links
 

1923 births
2005 deaths
Russian male fencers
Soviet male fencers
Olympic fencers of the Soviet Union
Fencers at the 1952 Summer Olympics
Fencers at the 1956 Summer Olympics
Martial artists from Moscow